Following are the results of the 2006-07 Owen Cup, the Staffordshire, England Rugby Union Cup played at Senior Level.

Knockout stage

Preliminary round

Uttoxeter          Stone

Owen Cup
Owen Cup